Roseanna's Grave (also known as For Roseanna) is a 1997 American romantic dramedy film directed by Paul Weiland. In his review, Roger Ebert concludes that Roseanna's Grave "isn't of much consequence, perhaps, and the gears of the plot are occasionally visible as they turn. But it's a small, sweet film that never tries for more than it's sure of, and the actors find it such a relief to be playing such goodhearted characters that we can almost feel it."

Plot

Cast
 Jean Reno as Marcello
 Mercedes Ruehl as Roseanna
 Polly Walker as Cecilia
 Mark Frankel as Antonio
 Trevor Peacock as Fredo Iaccoponi
 Fay Ripley as Francesca
 George Rossi as Sergeant Baggio
 Alfredo Varelli as Shop Owner (final film role)

References

External links

1996 films
1997 romantic comedy-drama films
American romantic comedy-drama films
PolyGram Filmed Entertainment films
Fiction about cemeteries
Films scored by Trevor Jones
Films directed by Paul Weiland
1990s English-language films
1990s American films